Baillie & the Boys were an American country music group. They were founded in 1987 by Kathie Baillie (lead vocals, guitar) and her husband, Michael Bonagura (background vocals, guitar), along with Alan LeBoeuf (bass guitar, background vocals). Not including Kathie Baillie's solo recordings, Baillie & the Boys have recorded five studio albums and charted ten Top-40 singles on the U.S. Billboard Hot Country Singles & Tracks charts (between 1987 and 1991).

After LeBoeuf's departure in 1988, Baillie & the Boys toured as a duo, with Lance Hoppen filling in as the third vocalist until Roger McVay was chosen as a replacement in 1995. Four years later, McVay departed and LeBoeuf rejoined. Although the trio has not charted a single since 1991, they continued to tour and record until 2012.

Background
Singers Alan LeBoeuf and Michael Bonagura were originally members of a New Jersey-based musical group called London Fog. In 1977, Bonagura met singer Kathie Baillie after a friend sent him recordings of her work; Bonagura and Baillie married the same year. Shortly afterward, Bonagura and Baillie joined up with LeBoeuf, forming the lineup for Baillie & the Boys. The trio toured throughout the state of New Jersey, and later moved to Nashville, Tennessee after a friend persuaded them.

The trio first found work singing harmony vocals on singles for Ed Bruce, Dan Seals, and Randy Travis, and Bonagura co-wrote Marie Osmond's single "There's No Stopping Your Heart". In 1987, Baillie & the Boys were signed to a record deal on the RCA Records label. Their self-titled album was released that year, producing three Top 20 singles on the U.S. Billboard Hot Country Singles (now Hot Country Songs) charts. Turn The Tide, their second album, was released a year later. It produced four consecutive Top 10 hits on the country charts, including "(Wish I Had a) Heart of Stone", their highest-charting single.

LeBoeuf left the group in 1988 shortly after the release of Turn the Tide. Baillie & the Boys then toured as a duo, with their 1990 album The Lights of Home including only Baillie and Bonagura, although Lance Hoppen, formerly of Orleans, filled in while the band was on tour with George Strait. The role was later filled by Roger McVay, who had toured with the band since 1992 but was not declared an official member until 1995. McVay's first appearance as an official member was on the 1996 album Lovin' Every Minute.

The group then went on hiatus before reuniting in August 1998 to perform a benefit concert in Daytona Beach, Florida, one year before McVay left. LeBoeuf again assumed the role of high harmony vocals, returning the band to its original lineup. A fifth album, titled The Road That Led Me to You, was released on an independent label in 2000. Baillie also released a solo album, titled Love's Funny That Way, on February 20, 2007. The title track of Baillie's solo album was released as a single shortly after. In December 2011, Baillie & the Boys released their latest album Unplugged, through the New York-based SynErgy Entertainment label.

Discography

Albums

Singles

Music videos

References

External links
Official website
Baillie & the Boys on TSE Entertainment

American country music groups
Musical groups from New Jersey
Vocal trios
RCA Records Nashville artists
Musical groups established in 1987